The World at War is a 1942 documentary film produced by the Office of War Information. One of the earliest long length films made by the government during the war, it attempted to explain the large picture of why the United States was at war, and the various causes and circumstances which brought the war into being. It can thus be seen as an anticipation, or trial run of the much better known six-part Why We Fight propaganda film series directed by Frank Capra.

See also 
List of Allied propaganda films of World War II

External links 

 

1942 films
American World War II propaganda films
1942 documentary films
American documentary films